Every One of Us is an album by Eric Burdon & The Animals. It was released in 1968 on MGM Records.

Background
Every One of Us was the second of three albums released by the band in the United States in that year (the album was not released in the United Kingdom). The single from the album was "White Houses", which charted in the United States and Canada.  The album combines several styles such as blues, folk rock, and raga rock, while the track "Year of the Guru" is notable for its early use of rapping vocals.

At the time of the release of the album in August 1968, both Danny McCulloch and Vic Briggs had been fired from the band earlier that summer, and Eric Burdon was seeking replacement musicians.  Unlike the previous two albums, involving shared songwriting credits with band members, Every One of Us is primarily compositions solely credited to Eric Burdon.

Critical Reception 
Billboard described this album as "Another fine album by Eric Burdon, and the Animals." Bruce Eder of Allmusic described it as "a good psychedelic blues album, filled with excellent musicianship." All Music Guide gave an unfavorable review of the album, describing it as "A rather spare and disappointing album, recorded amid the splintering of the original New Animals.

Track listing

Side One

Side Two

Personnel
Eric Burdon & The Animals
 Eric Burdon - vocals (except track 3) 
 Vic Briggs - guitar, bass 
 John Weider - guitar, celeste
 Danny McCulloch - bass, vocals, 12-string guitar
 Barry Jenkins - drums
 Zoot Money (credited as "George Bruno") - Hammond organ, vocals, piano

References

1968 albums
Eric Burdon albums
The Animals albums
MGM Records albums